Larry Dixon (born July 28, 1966) is an American fantasy artist and novelist.

Background
Dixon, the son of a Delta Force career commando, studied at The North Carolina School of the Arts and at Savannah College of Art & Design. In 1992, he married fantasy author Mercedes Lackey; they live in the Tulsa, Oklahoma area. Dixon, a sports car enthusiast, is also a storm spotter and volunteer firefighter.

Writing
Larry has collaborated with his wife, Mercedes Lackey, on a number of her books, including:

Storm Breaking (illustrator)
The Mage Wars Trilogy (DAW)
The Black Gryphon (co-author)
The White Gryphon (co-author)
The Silver Gryphon (co-author)
The SERRAted Edge Novels (Baen)
Chrome Circle (co-author)
Born to Run (co-author)
The Owl Trilogy (DAW)
Owlflight
Owlsight (co-author)
Owlknight (co-author)

Artwork
Dixon has contributed artwork to Wizards of the Coast's Dungeons & Dragons source books, including Oriental Adventures, Epic Level Handbook, and Fiend Folio. His skill with depicting birds of prey has often led to commissions with the United States Military and with Save Our American Raptors, an organization devoted to raptor rehabilitation.

Other work
As a birds-of-prey rehabilitation specialist, Dixon, along with Lackey, has returned over four hundred hawks, owls, falcons and corbies into the wild. He is currently  working toward his falconry license with a horned owl.

Dixon's wildlife rehabilitation led to a minor role in the creation of the digital effects for the giant eagles in the Lord of the Rings movies. Dixon took digital photographs of a stuffed golden eagle he is currently keeping for its owner, a local tribal elder. These photographs, along with castings of the beak and talons, were sent to Weta Digital in New Zealand to provide texture mapping for the digital model for Gwaihir and the other great eagles of J. R. R. Tolkien's Middle-earth.

Appearances
Guest of Honor appearances include:

 CrackerCon (1992)
 ICON 17 (1992)
 FenCon II (2005)
 Lunacon 2009
 GenCon 2013
 InConJunction 2017

References

External links
Official homepage
Dixon's blog

Official CAPEday website

1966 births
20th-century American male writers
20th-century American novelists
American fantasy writers
American male novelists
Fantasy artists
Living people
Role-playing game artists